The 1998 Cleveland Indians season was the franchise's 98th season. The Indians hoped to improve upon their American League pennant-winning season of 1997, but succumbed to the New York Yankees in the ALCS in six games.

Offseason
November 12, 1997: Paul Assenmacher was signed as a free agent with the Cleveland Indians.
December 1, 1997: Matt Williams was traded by the Cleveland Indians to the Arizona Diamondbacks for Travis Fryman, Tom Martin, and cash.
 December 8, 1997: Kenny Lofton signed as a free agent with the Cleveland Indians.
 December 8, 1997: Marquis Grissom was traded by the Cleveland Indians with Jeff Juden to the Milwaukee Brewers for Mike Fetters, Ben McDonald, and Ron Villone.
 December 8, 1997: Dwight Gooden signed as a free agent with the Cleveland Indians.
 December 20, 1997: Dave Weathers was selected off waivers by the Cincinnati Reds from the Cleveland Indians.

Regular season

Season standings

Record vs. opponents

Transactions
April 14, 1998: David Bell was selected off waivers by the Cleveland Indians from the St. Louis Cardinals.
May 6, 1998: Mark Whiten was signed as a free agent with the Cleveland Indians.
 June 2, 1998: C.C. Sabathia was drafted by the Cleveland Indians in the 1st round (20th pick) of the 1998 amateur draft. Player signed June 29, 1998.
July 2, 1998: Rex Hudler was signed as a free agent with the Cleveland Indians.
August 13, 1998: Cecil Fielder signed as a free agent with the Cleveland Indians.
August 31, 1998: David Bell was traded by the Cleveland Indians to the Seattle Mariners for Joey Cora.
September 18, 1998: Cecil Fielder was released by the Cleveland Indians.

Roster

Game log

|- bgcolor="#bbffbb"
| 1 || March 31 || @ Mariners || 10–9 || Mesa (1–0) || Fossas (0–1) || Jackson (1) || Kingdome || 57,822 || 1–0 || W1

|- bgcolor="#bbffbb"
| 2 || April 1 || @ Mariners || 9–7 || Wright (1–0) || Moyer (0–1) || Jackson (2) || Kingdome || 24,523 || 2–0 || W2
|- bgcolor="#bbffbb"
| 3 || April 3 || @ Angels || 6–2 || Burba (1–0) || McDowell (0–1) || – || Edison International Field of Anaheim || 26,240 || 3–0 || W3
|- bgcolor="#bbffbb"
| 4 || April 4 || @ Angels || 11–0 || Colon (1–0) || Watson (0–1) || – || Edison International Field of Anaheim || 34,834 || 4–0 || W4
|- bgcolor="#bbffbb"
| 5 || April 5 || @ Angels || 6–4 || Nagy (1–0) || Dickson (0–1) || Jackson (3) || Edison International Field of Anaheim || 35,628 || 5–0 || W5
|- bgcolor="#bbbbbb"
| – || April 6 || @ Athletics || colspan=8 | Suspended (curfew, continuation April 8)
|- bgcolor="#bbffbb
| 6 || April 8 || @ Athletics || 6–5 || Krivda (1–0) || Candiotti (0–2) || Jackson (4) || Network Associates Coliseum || 6,963 || 6–0 || W6
|- bgcolor="#ffbbbb"
| 7 || April 8 || @ Athletics || 1–3 || Rogers (1–0) || Burba (1–1) || Taylor (1) || Network Associates Coliseum || 8,361 || 6–1 || L1
|- bgcolor="#bbffbb"
| 8 || April 10 || Angels || 8–5 (10) || Plunk (1–0) || Percival (0–1) || – || Jacobs Field || 42,707 || 7–1 || W1
|- bgcolor="#bbffbb"
| 9 || April 11 || Angels || 8–5 || Nagy (2–0) || Dickson (0–2) || Jackson (5) || Jacobs Field || 42,802 || 8–1 || W2
|- bgcolor="#ffbbbb"
| 10 || April 12 || Angels || 1–12 || Finley (2–0) || Wright (1–1) || – || Jacobs Field || 42,555 || 8–2 || L1
|- bgcolor="#bbffbb"
| 11 || April 13 || Mariners || 6–5 || Burba (2–1) || Cloude (1–1) || Jackson (6) || Jacobs Field || 42,793 || 9–2 || W1
|- bgcolor="#bbffbb"
| 12 || April 14 || Mariners || 8–3 || Assenmacher (1–0) || Slocumb (0–2) || – || Jacobs Field || 40,490 || 10–2 || W2
|- bgcolor="#ffbbbb"
| 13 || April 15 || Mariners || 3–5 || Spoljaric (1–0) || Assenmacher (1–1) || Ayala (1) || Jacobs Field || 40,527 || 10–3 || L1
|- bgcolor="#ffbbbb"
| 14 || April 17 || @ Red Sox || 2–3 (10) || Gordon (2–1) || Assenmacher (1–2) || – || Fenway Park || 26,924 || 10–4 || L2
|- bgcolor="#bbffbb"
| 15 || April 18 || @ Red Sox || 7–4 || Martin (1–0) || Eckersley (1–1) || Jackson (7) || Fenway Park || 31,735 || 11–4 || W1
|- bgcolor="#ffbbbb"
| 16 || April 19 || @ Red Sox || 0–2 || Saberhagen (3–0) || Burba (2–2) || Gordon (4) || Fenway Park || 31,846 || 11–5 || L1
|- bgcolor="#ffbbbb"
| 17 || April 20 || @ Red Sox || 5–6 (11) || Gordon (3–1) || Plunk (1–1) || – || Fenway Park || 33,001 || 11–6 || L2
|- bgcolor="#bbffbb"
| 18 || April 21 || White Sox || 14–6 || Mesa (2–0) || Baldwin (2–2) || – || Jacobs Field || 42,836 || 12–6 || W1
|- bgcolor="#ffbbbb"
| 19 || April 22 || White Sox || 7–14 || Sirotka (3–1) || Nagy (2–1) || – || Jacobs Field || 42,840 || 12–7 || L1
|- bgcolor="#bbffbb"
| 20 || April 23 || White Sox || 5–4 || Plunk (2–1) || Castillo (0–1) || Jackson (8) || Jacobs Field || 42,865 || 13–7 || W1
|- bgcolor="#ffbbbb"
| 21 || April 24 || Red Sox || 5–7 || Wakefield (1–1) || Burba (2–3) || Gordon (6) || Jacobs Field || 40,570 || 13–8 || L1
|- bgcolor="#ffbbbb"
| 22 || April 25 || Red Sox || 2–3 || Saberhagen (4–0) || Colon (1–1) || Gordon (7) || Jacobs Field || 40,571 || 13–9 || L2
|- bgcolor="#bbbbbb"
| – || April 26 || Red Sox || colspan=8 | Postponed (rain, makeup July 21)
|- bgcolor="#ffbbbb"
| 23 || April 27 || @ White Sox || 3–10 || Sirotka (4–1) || Ogea (0–1) || – || Comiskey Park || 13,575 || 13–10 || L3
|- bgcolor="#bbffbb"
| 24 || April 28 || @ White Sox || 4–1 || Nagy (3–1) || Karchner (0–1) || Jackson (9) || Comiskey Park || 13,208 || 14–10 || W1
|- bgcolor="#ffbbbb"
| 25 || April 29 || Athletics || 4–11 || Rogers (4–1) || Wright (1–2) || – || Jacobs Field || 42,190 || 14–11 || L1
|- bgcolor="#ffbbbb"
| 26 || April 30 || Athletics || 2–5 || Mathews (3–3) || Assenmacher (1–3) || Taylor (6) || Jacobs Field || 42,855 || 14–12 || L2
|-

|- bgcolor="#bbffbb"
| 27 || May 1 || Devil Rays || 7–5 || Colon (2–1) || Springer (1–4) || Jackson (10) || Jacobs Field || 42,712 || 15–12 || W1
|- bgcolor="#bbffbb"
| 28 || May 2 || Devil Rays || 5–1 || Ogea (1–1) || Saunders (1–3) || – || Jacobs Field || 42,525 || 16–12 || W2
|- bgcolor="#bbffbb"
| 29 || May 3 || Devil Rays || 10–8 || Mesa (3–0) || R. Hernandez (0–2) || – || Jacobs Field || 42,597 || 17–12 || W3
|- bgcolor="#bbffbb"
| 30 || May 5 || Orioles || 6–5 || Assenmacher (2–3) || Benitez (1–1) || – || Jacobs Field || 40,706 || 18–12 || W4
|- bgcolor="#bbffbb"
| 31 || May 6 || Orioles || 14–5 || Burba (3–3) || Erickson (3–3) || – || Jacobs Field || 40,672 || 19–12 || W5
|- bgcolor="#bbffbb"
| 32 || May 7 || @ Rangers || 7–2 || Colon (3–1) || Sele (5–2) || – || The Ballpark in Arlington || 28,504 || 20–12 || W6
|- bgcolor="#ffbbbb"
| 33 || May 8 || @ Rangers || 3–6 || X. Hernandez (1–0) || Mesa (3–1) || Wetteland (8) || The Ballpark in Arlington || 38,067 || 20–13 || L1
|- bgcolor="#ffbbbb"
| 34 || May 9 || @ Rangers || 3–7 || Oliver (2–4) || Nagy (3–2) || – || The Ballpark in Arlington || 46,355 || 20–14 || L2
|- bgcolor="#ffbbbb"
| 35 || May 10 || @ Rangers || 3–5 || Burkett (3–4) || Wright (1–3) || Wetteland (9) || The Ballpark in Arlington || 31,232 || 20–15 || L3
|- bgcolor="#ffbbbb"
| 36 || May 11 || @ Devil Rays || 2–4 || Arrojo (5–2) || Burba (3–4) || R. Hernandez (4) || Tropicana Field || 27,097 || 20–16 || L4
|- bgcolor="#ffbbbb"
| 37 || May 12 || @ Devil Rays || 5–6 (14) || Santana (1–0) || Jackson (0–1) || – || Tropicana Field || 27,084 || 20–17 || L5
|- bgcolor="#ffbbbb"
| 38 || May 13 || @ Orioles || 1–8 || Drabek (3–4) || Ogea (1–2) || – || Oriole Park at Camden Yards || 43,379 || 20–18 || L6
|- bgcolor="#bbffbb"
| 39 || May 14 || @ Orioles || 5–4 || Nagy (4–2) || Rhodes (2–2) || Jackson (11) || Oriole Park at Camden Yards || 43,039 || 21–18 || W1
|- bgcolor="#bbffbb"
| 40 || May 15 || Rangers || 3–2 (14) || Krivda (2–0) || Levine (0–1) || – || Jacobs Field || 41,128 || 22–18 || W2
|- bgcolor="#bbffbb"
| 41 || May 16 || Rangers || 10–3 || Burba (4–4) || Witt (4–2) || – || Jacobs Field || 40,925 || 23–18 || W3
|- bgcolor="#ffbbbb"
| 42 || May 17 || Rangers || 0–1 || Sele (7–2) || Colon (3–2) || Wetteland (12) || Jacobs Field || 42,247 || 23–19 || L1
|- bgcolor="#bbffbb"
| 43 || May 19 || @ Royals || 16–3 || Ogea (2–2) || Rapp (3–4) || – || Kauffman Stadium || 13,367 || 24–19 || W1
|- bgcolor="#bbffbb"
| 44 || May 20 || @ Royals || 14–5 || Nagy (5–2) || Belcher (2–6) || – || Kauffman Stadium || 13,575 || 25–19 || W2
|- bgcolor="#bbffbb"
| 45 || May 21 || @ Royals || 6–2 || Wright (2–3) || Rosado (0–4) || – || Kauffman Stadium || 17,243 || 26–19 || W3
|- bgcolor="#bbffbb"
| 46 || May 22 || Blue Jays || 9–7 || Burba (5–4) || Hanson (0–2) || Jackson (12) || Jacobs Field || 43,269 || 27–19 || W4
|- bgcolor="#ffbbbb"
| 47 || May 23 || Blue Jays || 2–7 || Clemens (5–5) || Colon (3–3) || – || Jacobs Field || 43,306 || 27–20 || L1
|- bgcolor="#ffbbbb"
| 48 || May 24 || Blue Jays || 0–5 || Williams (5–2) || Gooden (0–1) || – || Jacobs Field || 43,194 || 27–21 || L2
|- bgcolor="#bbffbb"
| 49 || May 25 || Tigers || 7–4 || Nagy (6–2) || Castillo (2–2) || – || Jacobs Field || 43,342 || 28–21 || W1
|- bgcolor="#bbffbb"
| 50 || May 26 || Tigers || 9–2 || Wright (3–3) || Worrell (2–6) || – || Jacobs Field || 42,372 || 29–21 || W2
|- bgcolor="#bbffbb"
| 51 || May 28 || @ Blue Jays || 6–2 || Burba (6–4) || Carpenter (1–1) || – || SkyDome || 30,282 || 30–21 || W3
|- bgcolor="#bbffbb"
| 52 || May 29 || @ Blue Jays || 7–3 || Colon (4–3) || Clemens (5–6) || – || SkyDome || 29,085 || 31–21 || W4
|- bgcolor="#ffbbbb"
| 53 || May 30 || @ Blue Jays || 2–4 || Williams (6–2) || Gooden (0–2) || Myers (13) || SkyDome || 37,179 || 31–22 || L1
|- bgcolor="#bbffbb"
| 54 || May 31 || @ Blue Jays || 8–3 || Nagy (7–2) || Hentgen (7–4) || Mesa (1) || SkyDome || 30,090 || 32–22 || W1

|- bgcolor="#bbffbb"
| 55 || June 1 || @ Tigers || 2–0 || Wright (4–3) || Florie (3–1) || – || Tiger Stadium || 18,230 || 33–22 || W2
|- bgcolor="#bbffbb"
| 56 || June 2 || @ Tigers || 8–3 || Burba (7–4) || Thompson (3–6) || – || Tiger Stadium || 16,351 || 34–22 || W3
|- bgcolor="#ffbbbb"
| 57 || June 3 || @ Twins || 2–3 || Swindell (1–2) || Colon (4–4) || Aguilera (10) || Hubert H. Humphrey Metrodome || 8,897 || 34–23 || L1
|- bgcolor="#bbffbb"
| 58 || June 4 || @ Twins || 3–2 || Gooden (1–2) || Radke (7–4) || Jackson (13) || Hubert H. Humphrey Metrodome || 9,417 || 35–23 || W1
|- bgcolor="#ffbbbb"
| 59 || June 5 || @ Reds || 1–2 || Harnisch (6–1) || Nagy (7–3) || Shaw (17) || Cinergy Field || 43,532 || 35–24 || L1
|- bgcolor="#bbffbb"
| 60 || June 6 || @ Reds || 10–1 || Wright (5–3) || Remlinger (3–7) || – || Cinergy Field || 51,796 || 36–24 || W1
|- bgcolor="#bbffbb"
| 61 || June 7 || @ Reds || 6–1 || Burba (8–4) || Klingenbeck (0–1) || – || Cinergy Field || 49,589 || 37–24 || W2
|- bgcolor="#bbffbb"
| 62 || June 8 || Pirates || 8–0 || Colon (5–4) || Peters (1–4) || – || Jacobs Field || 43,068 || 38–24 || W3
|- bgcolor="#ffbbbb"
| 63 || June 9 || Pirates || 4–7 || Lieber (4–7) || Morman (0–1) || Rincon (6) || Jacobs Field || 41,762 || 38–25 || L1
|- bgcolor="#ffbbbb"
| 64 || June 10 || Pirates || 3–4 (11) || Loaiza (4–3) || Mesa (3–2) || Loiselle (12) || Jacobs Field || 43,101 || 38–26 || L2
|- bgcolor="#bbbbbb"
| – || June 12 || @ Yankees || colspan=8 | Postponed (rain, makeup September 21)
|- bgcolor="#bbbbbb"
| – || June 13 || @ Yankees || colspan=8 | Postponed (rain, makeup September 22)
|- bgcolor="#ffbbbb"
| 65 || June 14 || @ Yankees || 2–4 || Cone (9–1) || Wright (5–4) || Rivera (13) || Yankee Stadium || 42,949 || 38–27 || L3
|- bgcolor="#ffbbbb"
| 66 || June 15 || Royals || 6–7 (10) || Montgomery (1–3) || Mesa (3–3) || Whisenant (1) || Jacobs Field || 43,246 || 38–28 || L4
|- bgcolor="#bbffbb"
| 67 || June 16 || Royals || 9–1 || Colon (6–4) || Pichardo (2–6) || – || Jacobs Field || 43,184 || 39–28 || W1
|- bgcolor="#ffbbbb"
| 68 || June 17 || Royals || 3–4 || Rosado (3–5) || Gooden (1–3) || Montgomery (12) || Jacobs Field || 43,196 || 39–29 || L1
|- bgcolor="#ffbbbb"
| 69 || June 18 || Yankees || 2–5 || Nelson (4–3) || Assenmacher (2–4) || Rivera (15) || Jacobs Field || 43,096 || 39–30 || L2
|- bgcolor="#bbffbb"
| 70 || June 19 || Yankees || 7–4 || Wright (6–4) || Cone (9–2) || Jackson (14) || Jacobs Field || 43,180 || 40–30 || W1
|- bgcolor="#ffbbbb"
| 71 || June 20 || Yankees || 3–5 || Wells (9–2) || Burba (8–5) || Rivera (16) || Jacobs Field || 43,259 || 40–31 || L1
|- bgcolor="#bbffbb"
| 72 || June 21 || Yankees || 11–0 || Colon (7–4) || Irabu (6–3) || – || Jacobs Field || 43,104 || 41–31 || W1
|- bgcolor="#bbffbb"
| 73 || June 22 || @ Cubs || 3–1 || Gooden (2–3) || Tapani (8–6) || Jackson (15) || Wrigley Field || 39,556 || 42–31 || W2
|- bgcolor="#bbffbb"
| 74 || June 23 || @ Cubs || 5–4 || Plunk (3–1) || Adams (6–4) || Jackson (16) || Wrigley Field || 39,006 || 43–31 || W3
|- bgcolor="#bbffbb"
| 75 || June 24 || Cardinals || 14–3 || Wright (7–4) || Petkovsek (5–4) || – || Jacobs Field || 43,321 || 44–31 || W4
|- bgcolor="#bbffbb"
| 76 || June 25 || Cardinals || 8–2 || Burba (9–5) || Aybar (3–4) || – || Jacobs Field || 43,309 || 45–31 || W5
|- bgcolor="#bbffbb"
| 77 || June 26 || Astros || 4–2 || Colon (8–4) || Magnante (3–3) || Jackson (17) || Jacobs Field || 43,222 || 46–31 || W6
|- bgcolor="#ffbbbb"
| 78 || June 27 || Astros || 5–9 (11) || Wagner (2–2) || Mesa (3–4) || – || Jacobs Field || 43,132 || 46–32 || L1
|- bgcolor="#ffbbbb"
| 79 || June 28 || Astros || 3–12 || Reynolds (9–5) || Nagy (7–4) || Nitkowski (3) || Jacobs Field || 43,047 || 46–33 || L2
|- bgcolor="#ffbbbb"
| 80 || June 30 || @ Brewers || 4–5 || Eldred (4–5) || Wright (7–5) || Wickman (11) || County Stadium || 16,012 || 46–34 || L3

|- bgcolor="#bbffbb"
| 81 || July 1 || @ Brewers || 5–2 || Burba (10–5) || Juden (7–7) || Jackson (18) || County Stadium || 19,558 || 47–34 || W1
|- bgcolor="#bbffbb"
| 82 || July 2 || @ Brewers || 7–2 || Colon (9–4) || Woodall (4–3) || – || County Stadium || 21,022 || 48–34 || W2
|- bgcolor="#bbffbb"
| 83 || July 3 || @ Royals || 2–1 || Shuey (1–0) || Rosado (3–6) || Jackson (19) || Kauffman Stadium || 27,661 || 49–34 || W3
|- bgcolor="#ffbbbb"
| 84 || July 4 || @ Royals || 3–5 || Rapp (8–7) || Nagy (7–5) || Montgomery (18) || Kauffman Stadium || 34,270 || 49–35 || L1
|- bgcolor="#bbffbb"
| 85 || July 5 || @ Royals || 12–3 || Wright (8–5) || Rusch (6–10) || – || Kauffman Stadium || 15,507 || 50–35 || W1
|- bgcolor=#bbcaff
| – || July 7 || 69th All-Star Game || colspan=8 | National League vs. American League (Coors Field, Denver, Colorado)
|- bgcolor="#ffbbbb"
| 86 || July 9 || Twins || 0–3 || Tewksbury (5–9) || Burba (10–6) || Aguilera (19) || Jacobs Field || 43,236 || 50–36 || L1
|- bgcolor="#bbffbb"
| 87 || July 10 || Twins || 6–5 || Jackson (1–1) || Trombley (3–3) || – || Jacobs Field || 43,182 || 51–36 || W1
|- bgcolor="#bbffbb"
| 88 || July 11 || Twins || 12–2 || Gooden (3–3) || Radke (9–7) || – || Jacobs Field || 43,140 || 52–36 || W2
|- bgcolor="#ffbbbb"
| 89 || July 12 || Twins || 6–11 || Milton (5–7) || Nagy (7–6) || – || Jacobs Field || 43,053 || 52–37 || L1
|- bgcolor="#bbffbb"
| 90 || July 13 || Yankees || 4–1 || Wright (9–5) || Hernandez (3–2) || Jackson (20) || Jacobs Field || 43,177 || 53–37 || W1
|- bgcolor="#ffbbbb"
| 91 || July 14 || Yankees || 1–7 || Pettitte (12–5) || Burba (10–7) || – || Jacobs Field || 43,164 || 53–38 || L1
|- bgcolor="#ffbbbb"
| 92 || July 15 || @ Red Sox || 0–1 || Martinez (12–3) || Colon (9–5) || – || Fenway Park || 33,501 || 53–39 || L2
|- bgcolor="#ffbbbb"
| 93 || July 16 || @ Red Sox || 5–15 || Wakefield (11–4) || Gooden (3–4) || Lowe (1) || Fenway Park || 33,568 || 53–40 || L3
|- bgcolor="#ffbbbb"
| 94 || July 17 || @ White Sox || 3–4 || Simas (4–3) || Shuey (1–1) || – || Comiskey Park || 27,733 || 53–41 || L4
|- bgcolor="#bbffbb"
| 95 || July 18 || @ White Sox || 15–9 || Shuey (2–1) || Karchner (2–4) || Jackson (21) || Comiskey Park || 26,067 || 54–41 || W1
|- bgcolor="#ffbbbb"
| 96 || July 19 || @ White Sox || 1–8 || Sirotka (9–9) || Burba (10–8) || – || Comiskey Park || 23,543 || 54–42 || L1
|- bgcolor="#bbffbb"
| 97 || July 20 || @ White Sox || 5–4 || Colon (10–5) || Navarro (8–11) ||  Jackson (22) || Comiskey Park || 27,160 || 55–42 || W1
|- bgcolor="#ffbbbb"
| 98 || July 21 (1) || Red Sox || 7–10 || Martinez (13–3) || Gooden (3–5) || Gordon (27) || Jacobs Field || 42,874 || 55–43 || L1
|- bgcolor="#bbffbb"
| 99 || July 21 (2) || Red Sox || 4–2 (8) || Ogea (3–2) || Wakefield (11–5) || Jackson (23) || Jacobs Field || 43,227 || 56–43 || W1
|- bgcolor="#bbffbb"
| 100 || July 22 || Red Sox || 4–3 || Nagy (8–6) || Garces (1–1) || Jackson (24) || Jacobs Field || 43,073 || 57–43 || W2
|- bgcolor="#ffbbbb"
| 101 || July 23 || Tigers || 2–3 || Castillo (3–6) || Wright (9–6) || Jones (18) || Jacobs Field || 43,085 || 57–44 || L1
|- bgcolor="#bbffbb"
| 102 || July 24 || Tigers || 2–1 (11) || Reed (3–1) || Bochtler (0–1) || – || Jacobs Field || 43,156 || 58–44 || W1
|- bgcolor="#bbffbb"
| 103 || July 25 || Tigers || 6–5 || Colon (11–5) || Greisinger (1–5) || Jackson (25) || Jacobs Field || 43,094 || 59–44 || W2
|- bgcolor="#ffbbbb"
| 104 || July 26 || Tigers || 1–8 || Moehler (11–7) || Gooden (3–6) || – || Jacobs Field || 43,055 || 59–45 || L1
|- bgcolor="#bbffbb"
| 105 || July 28 || @ Mariners || 4–3 || Nagy (9–6) || Johnson (9–10) || Jackson (26) || Kingdome || 31,124 || 60–45 || W1
|- bgcolor="#bbffbb"
| 106 || July 29 || @ Mariners || 8–7 || Ogea (4–2) || McCarthy (0–1) || Jackson (27) || Kingdome || 25,953 || 61–45 || W2
|- bgcolor="#bbffbb"
| 107 || July 30 || @ Mariners || 9–8 (17) || Shuey (3–1) || Wells (0–2) || – || Kingdome || 31,081 || 62–45 || W3
|- bgcolor="#ffbbbb"
| 108 || July 31 || @ Athletics || 2–12 || Candiotti (6–13) || Colon (11–6) || – || Network Associates Coliseum || 14,096 || 62–46 || L1

|- bgcolor="#ffbbbb"
| 109 || August 1 || @ Athletics || 5–6 (10) || Mathews (5–4) || Karsay (0–1) || – || Network Associates Coliseum || 48,241 || 62–47 || L2
|- bgcolor="#ffbbbb"
| 110 || August 2 || @ Athletics || 5–7 || Mohler (3–2) || Nagy (9–7) || Taylor (23) || Network Associates Coliseum || 27,712 || 62–48 || L3
|- bgcolor="#ffbbbb"
| 111 || August 3 || @ Angels || 4–11 || Sparks (5–2) || Wright (9–7) || – || Edison International Field of Anaheim || 25,339 || 62–49 || L4
|- bgcolor="#ffbbbb"
| 112 || August 4 || @ Angels || 4–5 || Hasegawa (6–1) || Jones (3–5) || Percival (30) || Edison International Field of Anaheim || 29,916 || 62–50 || L5
|- bgcolor="#bbffbb"
| 113 || August 5 || @ Angels || 6–5 || Shuey (4–1) || Percival (2–5) || Assenmacher (1) || Edison International Field of Anaheim || 43,104 || 63–50 || W1
|- bgcolor="#bbffbb"
| 114 || August 7 || @ Devil Rays || 5–1 || Gooden (4–6) || Alvarez (5–10) || – || Tropicana Field || 29,590 || 64–50 || W2
|- bgcolor="#bbffbb"
| 115 || August 8 || @ Devil Rays || 6–2 || Nagy (10–7) || Rekar (1–4) || – || Tropicana Field || 35,283 || 65–50 || W3
|- bgcolor="#ffbbbb"
| 116 || August 9 || @ Devil Rays || 1–2 || Mecir (4–2) || Assenmacher (2–5) || – || Tropicana Field || 34,666 || 65–51 || L1
|- bgcolor="#ffbbbb"
| 117 || August 11 || Rangers || 1–2 || Loaiza (7–7) || Karsay (0–2) || Wetteland (32) || Jacobs Field || 42,992 || 65–52 || L2
|- bgcolor="#bbffbb"
| 118 || August 12 || Rangers || 6–3 || Colon (12–6) || Burkett (7–12) || Jackson (28) || Jacobs Field || 43,247 || 66–52 || W1
|- bgcolor="#ffbbbb"
| 119 || August 13 || Orioles || 4–7 (12) || Smith (5–5) || Reed (3–2) || Benitez (17) || Jacobs Field || 43,217 || 66–53 || L1
|- bgcolor="#ffbbbb"
| 120 || August 14 || Orioles || 3–15 || Mussina (11–6) || Nagy (10–8) || – || Jacobs Field || 43,169 || 66–54 || L2
|- bgcolor="#ffbbbb"
| 121 || August 15 || Orioles || 8–9 (10) || Benitez (5–3) || Jones (3–6) || – || Jacobs Field || 43,238 || 66–55 || L3
|- bgcolor="#bbffbb"
| 122 || August 16 || Orioles || 5–3 || Wright (10–7) || Kamieniecki (2–5) || Jackson (29) || Jacobs Field || 43,069 || 67–55 || W1
|- bgcolor="#bbffbb"
| 123 || August 17 || Devil Rays || 4–3 || Colon (13–6) || Alvarez (5–12) || Jackson (30) || Jacobs Field || 43,139 || 68–55 || W2
|- bgcolor="#bbffbb"
| 124 || August 18 || Devil Rays || 4–2 || Gooden (5–6) || Rekar (1–5) || Jackson (31) || Jacobs Field || 42,967 || 69–55 || W3
|- bgcolor="#ffbbbb"
| 125 || August 19 || @ Rangers || 1–3 || Sele (14–10) || Nagy (10–9) || Wetteland (33) || The Ballpark in Arlington || 26,146 || 69–56 || L1
|- bgcolor="#ffbbbb"
| 126 || August 20 || @ Rangers || 2–8 || Stottlemyre (12–10) || Burba (10–9) || Patterson (2) || The Ballpark in Arlington || 37,094 || 69–57 || L2
|- bgcolor="#bbffbb"
| 127 || August 21 || @ Orioles || 6–3 || Wright (11–7) || Kamieniecki (2–6) || – || Oriole Park at Camden Yards || 48,374 || 70–57 || W1
|- bgcolor="#ffbbbb"
| 128 || August 22 || @ Orioles || 3–6 || Erickson (14–9) || Colon (13–7) || – || Oriole Park at Camden Yards || 48,138 || 70–58 || L1
|- bgcolor="#bbffbb"
| 129 || August 23 || @ Orioles || 4–1 || Gooden (6–6) || Ponson (7–7) || Jackson (32) || Oriole Park at Camden Yards || 48,272 || 71–58 || W1
|- bgcolor="#bbffbb"
| 130 || August 25 || Mariners || 10–4 || Nagy (11–9) || Swift (10–8) || – || Jacobs Field || 43,113 || 72–58 || W2
|- bgcolor="#bbffbb"
| 131 || August 26 || Mariners || 5–3 || Burba (11–9) || Fassero (10–10) || Jackson (33) || Jacobs Field || 43,091 || 73–58 || W3
|- bgcolor="#ffbbbb"
| 132 || August 27 || Mariners || 4–10 || Moyer (11–8) || Wright (11–8) || – || Jacobs Field || 43,142 || 73–59 || L1
|- bgcolor="#ffbbbb"
| 133 || August 28 || Athletics || 6–14 (10) || Heredia (2–0) || Reed (3–3) || – || Jacobs Field || 43,191 || 73–60 || L2
|- bgcolor="#ffbbbb"
| 134 || August 29 || Athletics || 6–11 || Haynes (10–6) || Martin (1–1) || Taylor (28) || Jacobs Field || 43,020 || 73–61 || L3
|- bgcolor="#bbffbb"
| 135 || August 30 || Athletics || 9–4 || Nagy (12–9) || Rogers (12–7) || Jackson (34) || Jacobs Field || 42,951 || 74–61 || W1
|- bgcolor="#bbffbb"
| 136 || August 31 || Athletics || 15–6 || Burba (12–9) || Stein (5–8) || Jones (13) || Jacobs Field || 42,897 || 75–61 || W2
|-

|- bgcolor="#bbffbb"
| 137 || September 1 || Angels || 7–6 || Reed (4–3) || DeLucia (2–5) || – || Jacobs Field || 43,184 || 76–61 || W3
|- bgcolor="#ffbbbb"
| 138 || September 2 || Angels || 5–13 || Sparks (9–2) || Colon (13–8) || – || Jacobs Field || 43,200 || 76–62 || L1
|- bgcolor="#bbffbb"
| 139 || September 3 || @ Tigers || 2–1 || Gooden (7–6) || Thompson (10–13) || Jackson (35) || Tiger Stadium || 14,605 || 77–62 || W1
|- bgcolor="#bbffbb"
| 140 || September 4 || @ Tigers || 10–2 || Nagy (13–9) || Greisinger (4–8) || – || Tiger Stadium || 23,139 || 78–62 || W2
|- bgcolor="#bbffbb"
| 141 || September 5 || @ Tigers || 5–4 || Burba (13–9) || Powell (3–6) || Jackson (36) || Tiger Stadium || 30,031 || 79–62 || W3
|- bgcolor="#ffbbbb"
| 142 || September 6 || @ Tigers || 2–3 || Florie (7–9) || Wright (11–9) || Jones (23) || Tiger Stadium || 32,815 || 79–63 || L1
|- bgcolor="#ffbbbb"
| 143 || September 7 || @ Blue Jays || 1–15 || Escobar (5–2) || Ogea (4–3) || – || SkyDome || 31,089 || 79–64 || L2
|- bgcolor="#bbffbb"
| 144 || September 9 || @ Blue Jays || 6–3 (13) || Jones (4–6) || Almanzar (1–2) || Jackson (37) || SkyDome || 32,157 || 80–64 || W1
|- bgcolor="#ffbbbb"
| 145 || September 11 || White Sox || 2–3 || Abbott (2–0) || Nagy (13–10) || Howry (6) || Jacobs Field || 43,210 || 80–65 || L1
|- bgcolor="#ffbbbb"
| 146 || September 12 || White Sox || 4–6 || Baldwin (11–5) || Shuey (4–2) || Howry (7) || Jacobs Field || 43,170 || 80–66 || L2
|- bgcolor="#bbffbb"
| 147 || September 13 || White Sox || 6–3 || Shuey (5–2) || Ward (1–2) || Jackson (38) || Jacobs Field || 43,178 || 81–66 || W1
|- bgcolor="#bbffbb"
| 148 || September 14 || Blue Jays || 6–3 || Gooden (8–6) || Sinclair (0–2) || Jackson (39) || Jacobs Field || 43,152 || 82–66 || W2
|- bgcolor="#bbffbb"
| 149 || September 15 || Blue Jays || 7–5 || Ogea (5–3) || Stieb (1–2) || Assenmacher (2) || Jacobs Field || 43,323 || 83–66 || W3
|- bgcolor="#bbffbb"
| 150 || September 16 || Twins || 8–6 || Nagy (14–10) || Tewksbury (7–11) || Assenmacher (3) || Jacobs Field || 43,277 || 84–66 || W4
|- bgcolor="#bbffbb"
| 151 || September 17 || Twins || 9–1 || Burba (14–9) || Milton (7–13) || – || Jacobs Field || 43,299 || 85–66 || W5
|- bgcolor="#bbffbb"
| 152 || September 18 || Royals || 4–1 || Wright (12–9) || Appier (1–1) || Shuey (1) || Jacobs Field || 43,260 || 86–66 || W6
|- bgcolor="#ffbbbb"
| 153 || September 19 || Royals || 6–7 || Service (6–3) || Shuey (5–3) || Montgomery (35) || Jacobs Field || 43,182 || 86–67 || L1
|- bgcolor="#bbffbb"
| 154 || September 20 || Royals || 5–3 || Colon (14–8) || Rapp (12–13) || Jackson (40) || Jacobs Field || 43,082 || 87–67 || W1
|- bgcolor="#bbffbb"
| 155 || September 21 || @ Yankees || 4–1 || Nagy (15–10) || Pettitte (16–11) || Shuey (2) || Yankee Stadium || 21,449 || 88–67 || W2
|- bgcolor="#ffbbbb"
| 156 || September 22 (1) || @ Yankees || 4–10 || Mendoza (10–2) || Burba (14–10) || – || Yankee Stadium || 14,840 || 88–68 || L1
|- bgcolor="#ffbbbb"
| 157 || September 22 (2) || @ Yankees || 1–5 || Irabu (13–9) || Ogea (5–4) || – || Yankee Stadium || 32,315 || 88–69 || L2
|- bgcolor="#ffbbbb"
| 158 || September 23 || @ Yankees || 4–8 || Bradley (2–1) || Jacome (0–1) || – || Yankee Stadium || 32,367 || 88–70 || L3
|- bgcolor="#ffbbbb"
| 159 || September 24 || @ Twins || 0–2 || Radke (12–14) || Wright (12–10) || Aguilera (38) || Hubert H. Humphrey Metrodome || 7,800 || 88–71 || L4
|- bgcolor="#bbffbb"
|- bgcolor="#ffbbbb"
| 160 || September 25 || @ Twins || 4–5 || Aguilera (4–9) || Shuey (5–4) || – || Hubert H. Humphrey Metrodome || 11,940 || 88–72 || L5
|- bgcolor="#bbffbb"
| 161 || September 26 || @ Twins || 9–5 || Burba (15–9) || Tewksbury (7–13) || – || Hubert H. Humphrey Metrodome || 28,764 || 89–72 || W1
|- bgcolor="#ffbbbb"
| 162 || September 27 || @ Twins || 2–6 || Milton (8–14) || Colon (14–9) || Trombley (1) || Hubert H. Humphrey Metrodome || 12,049 || 89–73 || L1
|-

|- style="text-align:center;"
| Legend:       = Win       = Loss       = PostponementBold = Indians team member

Player stats

Batting

Starters by position
Note: Pos = Position; G = Games played; AB = At bats; R = Runs; H = Hits; HR = Home runs; RBI = Runs batted in; Avg. = Batting average; Slg. = Slugging average; SB = Stolen bases

Other batters 
Note: G = Games played; AB = At bats; H = Hits; Avg. = Batting average; HR = Home runs; RBI = Runs batted in

Pitching

Starting pitchers 
Note: G = Games pitched; IP = Innings pitched; W = Wins; L = Losses; ERA = Earned run average; SO = Strikeouts

Other pitchers 
Note: G = Games pitched; IP = Innings pitched; W = Wins; L = Losses; ERA = Earned run average; SO = Strikeouts

Relief pitchers 
Note: G = Games pitched; W = Wins; L = Losses; SV = Saves; ERA = Earned run average; SO = Strikeouts

Award winners

All-Star Game

Minor league affiliates

References

1998 Cleveland Indians at Baseball Reference
1998 Cleveland Indians at Baseball Almanac

Cleveland Guardians seasons
Cleveland Indians season
American League Central champion seasons
Cleve